Nachavule is a 2008 Telugu film directed by Ravi Babu and produced by Ramoji Rao. The film was the debut for the stars Tanish and Maadhavi Latha. The film is a teenage romantic comedy. It was released on 19 December, 2008. The film won three Nandi Awards.

Synopsis 

The film is told as an autobiographical narrative in the voice of Luv Kumar. 

Luv Kumar's parents fell in love and married despite belonging to different linguistic backgrounds. In the present, love has faded, because his father takes his wife’s affection for granted.  

Looking for a female partner, Luv scours Hyderabad. He believes in a twisted logic that getting the first girlfriend is tough and after that, the deluge would follow. He befriends Anu under strange circumstances. He shows off his new girlfriend to whoever cares. Suddenly, girls start finding him attractive, including women who had rejected him earlier. He goes on a spree with numerous girls, conveniently forgetting Anu who has fallen hopelessly in love with him. At a party, he lies to friends within Anu’s earshot that he has slept with her. This breaks Anu’s heart and she decides to leave him and the town. Luv cannot understand her sudden coldness, but continues to ignore her. 

When Luv's mother dies, plunging his family into enormous grief, his father reflects on his relationship with his wife and feels terrible that he had taken her love for granted. He tells his son that we only realize the true value of people once they have left us. This strikes a chord in Luv who realizes how he has taken Anu’s love for granted and hurt her. He leaves to find Anu and win her back.

Cast

Tanish as Lava Kumar "Luv"
Maadhavi Latha as Anu
Y. Kasi Viswanath as Luv's father
Raksha as Sushma, Luv's mother
Narasimha as Srinu
Naveen as Mandy
Kamesh as Anu's father
Narayana Reddy
Prasad as Anu's neighbour
Sarath
Allari Subhashini
Sudeepa Pinky as Nurse

Soundtrack

The music was composed by Shekhar Chandra and the lyrics were penned by Bhaskarabhatla.

Awards

Controversy 
Maadhavi Latha alleged that she was severely harassed and her mother scolded for refusing to become close with an important person in the movie team during shooting, and refusing to wear a short dress. Another major revelation is that production company Ushakiran Movies pays less than production houses.

References

External links

2008 films
2000s Telugu-language films
Films directed by Ravi Babu